Football in Tasmania can refer to a number of sports played in Tasmania, Australia:

Major codes of football in Tasmania
Australian rules football in Tasmania
Association football in Tasmania

Minor codes in Tasmania
Tasmanian Rugby Union
Tasmanian Rugby League
Tasmanian Gaelic Football and Hurling Association

See also
Sport in Tasmania